Ab Mal or Abmal may refer to:
 Abmal, Qaem Shahr, Mazandaran Province
 Abmal, Sari, Mazandaran Province
 Ab Mal, Mashhad, Razavi Khorasan Province
 Ab Mal, Sarakhs, Razavi Khorasan Province